Dolicharthria is a genus of small moths belonging to the family Crambidae. Stenia is usually synonymized with it, but may be distinct.

Species
Dolicharthria aetnaealis (Duponchel, 1833)
Dolicharthria aquirrealis (Schaus, 1940)
Dolicharthria bruguieralis (Duponchel, 1833)
Dolicharthria carbonalis (Warren, 1896)
Dolicharthria cerialis (Stoll in Cramer & Stoll, 1782)
Dolicharthria daralis (Chrétien, 1911)
Dolicharthria desertalis Hampson, 1907
Dolicharthria grisealis (Hampson, 1899)
Dolicharthria hieralis (Swinhoe, 1904)
Dolicharthria intervacatalis (Christoph, 1877)
Dolicharthria lubricalis (Dognin, 1905)
Dolicharthria mabillealis (Viette, 1953)
Dolicharthria metasialis (Rebel, 1916)
Dolicharthria modestalis (Saalmüller, 1880)
Dolicharthria paediusalis (Walker, 1859)
Dolicharthria phaeospilalis (Hampson, 1907)
Dolicharthria psologramma (Meyrick, 1937)
Dolicharthria punctalis (Denis & Schiffermüller, 1775)
Dolicharthria retractalis (Hampson, 1912)
Dolicharthria retractalis (Hampson, 1917)
Dolicharthria signatalis (Zeller, 1852)
Dolicharthria stigmosalis (Herrich-Schäffer, 1848)
Dolicharthria tenebrosalis (Rothschild, 1915)
Dolicharthria tenellalis (Snellen, 1895)
Dolicharthria triflexalis (Gaede, 1916)

Former species
Dolicharthria heringi (Rebel, 1939)

Footnotes

References
  (2009): Markku Savela's Lepidoptera and some other life forms – Dolicharthria. Version of 2009-MAY-16. Retrieved 2010-APR-12.

Spilomelinae
Crambidae genera
Taxa named by James Francis Stephens